Stir of Echoes: The Homecoming is a 2007 American made-for-television supernatural horror film produced by Lions Gate Entertainment. The film premiered on the Sci Fi Channel. Originally titled The Dead Speak, it was written and directed by Ernie Barbarash and is a sequel to the 1999 feature film Stir of Echoes, although its only connection to the previous work is a similar premise and the inclusion of Jake Witzky, who had a key role in the original film but is only a secondary character here.

The film was released on DVD as Stir of Echoes 2.

Plot
Ted Cogan (Rob Lowe) is a United States National Guard captain commanding a National Guard unit in Iraq. When a van pulls into his checkpoint, he orders it to stop, but it does not. He orders his men to fire a warning shot, but they shoot up the van instead.

A few booms and crackles later, an Iraqi girl comes out of the van, then the whole thing catches fire, and Ted finds that they have just killed an innocent family. Ted tries to save the girl, but the vehicle explodes and Ted's unit is attacked, leaving Ted in a coma.

Two weeks later, Ted wakes up and gets to return home to his wife Molly (Marnie McPhail) and teenage son Max (Ben Lewis) in Chicago, but he is suffering from post-traumatic stress disorder complicated by the extreme guilt he feels about the Iraqi family's deaths. Little does Ted know that the terror has only just begun. He starts having visions of a burned man who wants him to right a wrong.

As Ted begins to lose his grip on both his sanity and his family, he seeks medical support for his post-traumatic stress disorder, but his financial situation does not allow him to pay for a treatment, and the government denies him. Ted enlists the aid of an equally unhinged psychic named Jake Witzky (Zachary Bennett) to help him understand his terrifying and relentless dreams. Jake encourages Ted to figure out what the burned man wants.

Max's girlfriend Sammi (Tatiana Maslany) and their friend Luke (Shawn Roberts) get killed in a car crash that injures Max. This leads to a series of messages from the spirit haunting Ted, which reveals itself as the spirit of Farzan (Vik Sahay), an Arab-American college student who was beaten up and then set on fire. Farzan wants Ted to find his killers—whose identities shock Ted to the very core.

Sammi and Luke were devastated and extremely angry about the deaths of their fathers in Iraq. Max was angry about what happened to Ted in Iraq. That resulted in them becoming furious at Arab people. When they stumble upon Farzan and he asks them for a jack to fix a flat tire, the friends are hesitant to help when they see who he is. Farzan tries to defuse the tension by explaining that he is a local student, born and raised in America. Sammi insults Farzan's bumper sticker that chides the fight for oil, and she drunkenly begins to hurl insults as she commands Max and Luke back to the car. As they prepare to leave without helping him, Farzan curses at Sammi, leading her to get out of the car and strike him, using her whiskey bottle as a weapon. The situation escalates as the boys jump in, and Farzan is ruthlessly attacked. As he lies bleeding, Sammi suggests cutting his head off, similar to what her father endured. Max wishes to leave him, but Sammi pours her liquor over him instead, asking for a lighter to set him on fire. Farzan lies helpless and bleeding as the friends brutally kill him and flee the scene.

As Ted and Molly grapple with what to do next, they argue about Max's future. Ted wants to go to the police because it's morally right, but Molly reminds him of the innocent people he killed as a soldier, leading to an impasse. Ted asks the spirit of Farzan to reveal his wishes, and breaks down under the pressure of the vision. Molly races to get a doctor for Ted, but returns to find him possessed as the spirit and holding a loaded gun to Max's head. A nurse runs for help while Ted and Molly fight over the weapon. Ted, still under the control of the angry spirit, asks Molly to kill him and turns the gun on himself. In the struggle, Ted accidentally shoots Molly and she dies in his arms. As she takes her last breath, she begs the angry spirit not to harm her son.

At Molly’s burial Ted is explaining to Max why it was necessary to turn him in for the murder, and asks Max to forgive him. The police then take Max to return him to jail. The last scene shows Ted locked up in a mental hospital where the spirit of Molly visits him to ask if the spirit of the murdered boy is now satisfied.

Cast
 Rob Lowe as Ted Cogan
 Marnie McPhail as Molly Cogan
 Katya Gardner as April
 Zachary Bennett as Jake Witzky
 Ben Lewis as Max Cogan
 Tatiana Maslany as Sammi
 Shawn Roberts as Luke
 Vik Sahay as Farzan
 Colin Williams as Drexel
 Pj Lazic as Nunez
 Krista Sutton as Tessa
 Neil Crone as Gary
 Elias Zarou as Iraqi Officer
 Nicholas Carella as Kablinsky
 Cristine Prosperi as Iraqi Girl
 Jason Mercury as Translator
 Bill Lake as Colonel
 Shari Hollett as Army Doctor
 Greer Kent as Administrator
 Mike 'Nug' Nahrgang as Security Guard
 Eugene Clark as Older Vet
 Lucy Filippone as Latina Woman
 Mikayla Serena Alpas as Carlita "Little Carlita"
 Jasmin Geljo as Maintenance Man
 George Buza as Albino Man
 Grace Lynn Kung as Friendly Nurse
 Kim Roberts as Head Nurse
 Anne Tager Page as Alice "Old Lady Alice"

Production
The film was shot in Stouffville and Toronto, both in Ontario, Canada. It was released on DVD on November 20, 2007.

Reception
Reviews for the film were predominantly negative, with Bloody Disgusting's Ryan Daley writing that "It goes without saying that any Stir of Echoes sequel made without [original director] [David] Koepp’s involvement is sure to turn out to be a real hack job, and this shoe definitely fits Homecoming." Horror.com also panned the film, citing the film's repetition and lack of suspense as some of the reasons the film disappointed. Jeff Allard of Shock Till You Drop criticized the film, stating "this 'sequel' fails to show the same instincts for the genre, leaving it as just an echo of its far more accomplished predecessor."

See also
 List of ghost films

References

External links
 
 
 

2007 films
2007 horror films
2007 television films
2000s supernatural films
American supernatural horror films
Canadian supernatural horror films
Canadian horror television films
English-language Canadian films
Films set in Chicago
Iraq War in television
Syfy original films
Television sequel films
Films directed by Ernie Barbarash
2000s American films
2000s Canadian films